Best Friends is a 1982 American romantic comedy film starring Burt Reynolds and Goldie Hawn. It is based on the true story of the relationship between its writers Barry Levinson and Valerie Curtin. The film was directed by Norman Jewison.

Plot
Richard Babson and Paula McCullen are a couple of Hollywood screenwriters who have lived and worked together for a number of years. Richard would like to get married, but Paula does not feel the need.

Having just written a film script for producer Larry Weissman, the couple decides to get married without letting anyone else know. Paula can tell it is important to Richard, so she reluctantly agrees.

They are wed in a Los Angeles marriage bureau by a man named Jorge Medina in heavily accented English, making for a comical moment. For a honeymoon trip, they travel cross-country by train to inform their parents back East about what they have done.

The first stop is Buffalo, New York, where they are met in a winter wonderland by Paula's parents. Eleanor and Tim McCullen are old-fashioned, so Paula informs Richard that they will need to sleep in separate beds. Richard isn't happy about being treated like a child or about the frigid climate and the constantly open window.

From there they go to Virginia to visit Richard's parents, who reside in a giant high-rise condominium. No window is ever opened there, and Paula, feeling increasing panic attacks, is in dire need of some fresh air. She also accidentally overdoses on Valium and goes face-first into a salad at lunch.

The Babsons excitedly believe that Paula and Richard are engaged but devastated to learn that they are  married. They throw a party at a restaurant, where Paula is upset by the comments of guests.

She and Richard are barely on speaking terms when Larry Weissman shows up, desperate for pages of a script rewrite. Paula insists that they return home to California immediately, but once there, their personal and professional relationship has soured.

Larry locks them in a room, where the writers bicker and get no work done. Paula again demands fresh air until Richard breaks a window. When they finally talk it through, they are in agreement that getting married might not have been the best idea. They finish the rewrite and then walk off into the sunset, which turns out to be a Hollywood prop.

Cast

In addition, Valerie Curtin, who wrote the film's screenplay with husband Barry Levinson (they divorced the year it was released), has an uncredited cameo as Paula's friend sitting in a playpen.

Production
Barry Levinson and Valerie Curtin wrote the screenplay based on their relationship. They had made And Justice for All (1979) with Norman Jewison and showed him a copy of the script. Jewison felt the draft had problems but was persuaded to make it by Goldie Hawn who read the script and was enthusiastic.

"I had been impressed with her talent ever since Sugarland Express," said Jewison. "I thought she was one of the most honest performers, so I said, 'If you'll do it, I'll do it'."

Hawn later said her part was "probably my most mature role" to date.

They decided together on Burt Reynolds as costar. "My instinct was that we should have star chemistry, like Cary Grant and Carole Lombard, like I had on The Thomas Crown Affair, with Steve McQueen and Faye Dunaway."

There were six weeks of filming in New York State, Virginia, Maryland and Washington, D.C., then the unit shifted to Los Angeles.

Jewison said he "took my time" with the film. "I made it very carefully, indeed...I had a wonderful time making the film and I haven't seen such good chemistry between leading players since I made The Thomas Crown Affair."

Songs
The film's theme song "How Do You Keep the Music Playing?", was composed by Michel Legrand with lyrics by Alan and Marilyn Bergman. In the film, the song (performed by Patti Austin and James Ingram) is first heard as Richard and Paula return to Los Angeles after their honeymoon and then heard during the closing credits. How Do You Keep the Music Playing? was nominated for an Academy Award and has become a popular standard and recorded by Johnny Mathis, Tony Bennett, Frank Sinatra, Barbra Streisand, Celine Dion, Jean, Scherrie & Lynda of The Supremes and Shirley Bassey. Another song by the same songwriters and performers, "Think About Love," is played during a montage of the train journey.

Reception
Roger Ebert gave the film three-and-a-half stars out of four and wrote that the plot "sounds like a series of fairly predictable scenes. But they're redeemed by the writing and acting." Janet Maslin of The New York Times stated that Reynolds and Hawn made "a surprisingly appealing team, the surprise being that two individually stellar comic actors can work so comfortably together. Each of them works on a lower wattage than usual, since the emphasis here is on friendliness, rather than on madcap joking." Variety called it "a very engaging film...Even if it is initially jarring to accept Hawn and Reynolds as screenwriters, they are thoroughly believable as two people struggling to make their relationship work. Hawn especially has kept her customary kookiness in check and conveys her character's plight with maturity and charm." Gary Arnold of The Washington Post called the film "exceptionally authentic and endearing...I suppose Reynolds and Hawn have certainly enjoyed showier showcasing, but it should do them no harm at all to be recognized as a likably self-effacing romantic comedy team in a new romantic comedy of rare sweetness and intelligence."

Kevin Thomas of the Los Angeles Times was less enthused, writing that the film "quickly proves to be the familiar instance of the comedy that presents its central figures in the round only to satirize heavily all the peripheral people, most of whom are weighed down in shtick." Gene Siskel of the Chicago Tribune gave the film two stars out of four and asked "Who wants to see such upbeat performers as Hawn and Reynolds bitch at each other for nearly two hours? The casting is wrong here." Pauline Kael of The New Yorker wrote "The script probably reads fine, but it plays all wrong. The dialogue is too neatly worked out; there's no way to speak it without making us aware of how clever it is—how flip yet knowing."

The film has a score of 62% on Rotten Tomatoes, based on 13 reviews.

Box office
The film opened on 1,062 screens and grossed $4,022,891 for the weekend to finish in fourth place behind Tootsie, The Toy and The Dark Crystal.

Awards and nominations

The film is recognized by American Film Institute in these lists:
 2004: AFI's 100 Years...100 Songs:	
 "How Do You Keep the Music Playing?" – Nominated

References

External links
 
 
 
 
 

1982 comedy films
1982 drama films
1980s American films
1982 films
1980s romantic comedy-drama films
American romantic comedy-drama films
1980s English-language films
Fictional married couples
Films scored by Michel Legrand
Films about screenwriters
Films directed by Norman Jewison
Films set in New York (state)
Films set in Los Angeles
Films set in Virginia
Films shot in Buffalo, New York
Films shot in Virginia
Rail transport films
Warner Bros. films